Daniel Edward Pilarczyk (August 12, 1934 – March 22, 2020) was an American prelate of the Roman Catholic Church. He served as Archbishop of Cincinnati from 1982 to 2009.

Early life and education
Daniel Pilarczyk was born in Dayton, Ohio, the only child of Daniel Joseph and Frieda (Hilgefort) Pilarczyk. After receiving his early education at Our Lady of Mercy and St. Anthony parochial schools, he attended Sacred Heart Latin School. At the age of 14, he entered St. Gregory Seminary in Cincinnati. In 1953, he was sent to continue his studies at the Pontifical Urbaniana University in Rome, from where he obtained a Licentiate of Philosophy (1956) and Licentiate of Sacred Theology (1960). His mother died in 1955, and his father remarried Marie Scothorn.

Priesthood
Pilarczyk was ordained to the priesthood by Cardinal Grégoire-Pierre Agagianian on December 20, 1959. He remained in Rome for his postgraduate studies, and earned a Doctor of Sacred Theology from the Urban College in 1961. Upon his return to the United States, he became assistant chancellor of the Archdiocese of Cincinnati and a curate at St. Louis Church. He then taught Latin and Greek at his alma mater of St. Gregory Seminary from 1963 to 1974. During this time, he received a Master's degree from Xavier University in 1965. He became rector of St. Gregory Seminary in 1968; at the age of 31, he was the youngest man to be named to that position. He later earned a Ph.D. from the University of Cincinnati in 1969.

Episcopacy

Auxiliary Bishop of Cincinnati
On November 12, 1974, Pilarczyk was appointed Auxiliary Bishop of Cincinnati and Titular Bishop of Hodelm by Pope Paul VI. He received his episcopal consecration on the following December 20 from Archbishop Joseph Bernardin, with Archbishop Nicholas Elko and Bishop James W. Malone serving as co-consecrators. From 1974 to 1982, he served as director of Archdiocesan Educational Services and chairman of the Archdiocesan Commission on Education. He also served as chairman of the governing board of St. Rita School for the Deaf from 1977 to 1982. He once said, "Education means development, growth. When God creates us, He doesn't quite finish it. He lets us do some of the finishing touches. That's what education is. It's a wonderful gift. The ability to become educated ... [is] a wonderful gift which sometimes people overlook or misuse."

Within the United States Conference of Catholic Bishops, he became a member of the Committee on Doctrine in 1976 and chairman of the Committee on Education in 1978.

Archbishop of Cincinnati
He was appointed Archbishop of Cincinnati—succeeding Joseph Cardinal Bernardin who had been named Archbishop of Chicago—on October 30, 1982. Archbishop Pilarczyk served as vice president (1986–1989) and president (1989–1992) of the National Conference of Catholic Bishops.

During Pilarczyk's tenure there were cases of sexual abuse which were covered up. In 2003, Pilarczyk pleaded no contest to five misdemeanor counts of failing to report felonies and admitted facts that constituted guilt; the archdiocese was found guilty of failing to report its crimes, and the judge said that church leaders had placed self-preservation ahead of their moral duty to minister to the victims.

In October 2008, Bishop Dennis Marion Schnurr of the Roman Catholic Diocese of Duluth, Minnesota, was named by Pope Benedict XVI as Pilarczyk's coadjutor archbishop. This means Schnurr served as the auxiliary bishop and chief vicar general to Pilarczyk, but unlike other auxiliary bishops that had served, he had the right as coadjutor to immediately succeed him as archbishop when Pilarczyk retired.

On August 12, 2009, Pilarczyk officially handed in his resignation on his 75th birthday, as mandated by the Vatican. It was formally accepted by Pope Benedict XVI on December 21, 2009 (the day after he celebrated both 50 years as a priest and 35 years as a bishop). He was immediately succeeded as Archbishop of Cincinnati by Coadjutor Archbishop Schnurr.

After retirement
Pilarczyk continued to be involved in the Greater Cincinnati community, specifically with the growth of the archdiocese in multiple counties.  He expressed a fondness for preaching and worked to address what he considered misconceptions regarding Catholicism. In January 2006, his book entitled Being Catholic: How We Believe, Practice, And Think was published. Pilarczyk wrote at least 12 books on the Catholic faith. After years of declining health, he died on March 22, 2020. His funeral mass, which was streamed online and closed to public attendance due to the COVID-19 pandemic, was held in St. Peter in Chains Cathedral on March 27, 2020.

See also
 

 Catholic Church hierarchy
 Catholic Church in the United States
 Historical list of the Catholic bishops of the United States
 List of Catholic bishops of the United States
 Lists of patriarchs, archbishops, and bishops

References

External links
 Roman Catholic Archdiocese of Cincinnati official website
12 Questions With Archbishop Daniel Pilarczyk from Local 12 News, Cincinnati, Ohio.

"Cincinnati archdiocese convicted for failing to report sex abuse" from BNET Research Center

Roman Catholic archbishops of Cincinnati
1934 births
2020 deaths
Writers from Dayton, Ohio
20th-century Roman Catholic archbishops in the United States
21st-century Roman Catholic archbishops in the United States
American people of Polish descent